is a railway station on the Nippō Main Line operated by Kyūshū Railway Company in Beppu, Ōita, Japan.

Lines

Layout 
The station consists of two side platforms serving two tracks at grade. The station building is an original Meiji-period Japanese style wooden structure from the time the station was opened and it has been designated by Beppu City as a tangible cultural property. The station facilities include a waiting area and a staffed ticket window. Access to the opposite side platform is by means of a footbridge.

Management of the station has been outsourced to the JR Kyushu Tetsudou Eigyou Co., a wholly owned subsidiary of JR Kyushu specialising in station services. It staffs the ticket booth which is equipped with a POS machine but does not have a Midori no Madoguchi facility.

Adjacent stations

History
The Kyushu Railway was nationalised on 1 July 1907. On 15 December 1923, the Hōshū Main Line was renamed the Nippō Main Line. On 15 April 1934, the station was renamed Higashi-Beppu. With the privatization of Japanese National Railways (JNR), the successor of JGR, on 1 April 1987, the station came under the control of JR Kyushu.

On 5 February 2005, the station building was designated as a tangible cultural property (i.e. given protected heritage status) by Beppu City.

Passenger statistics
In fiscal 2015, there were a total of 93,088 boarding passengers, giving a daily average of 255 passengers.

See also
List of railway stations in Japan

References

External links

  

Railway stations in Ōita Prefecture
Railway stations in Japan opened in 1911
Beppu, Ōita